Estadio Julián Tesucún is a multi-use stadium in San José, Guatemala.  It is currently used mostly for football matches, on club level by Heredia Jaguares de Peten of the Liga Nacional de Fútbol de Guatemala. The stadium has a capacity of 8,000 spectators.

References

Multi-purpose stadiums in Guatemala
Football venues in Guatemala